Superchief is a documentary film directed by Nick Kurzon that is about a campaign and election for a new tribal chairman of the White Earth Ojibwe Reservation. 
The film's TV debut was on HBO Signature channel.

References

External links 
http://www.der.org/films/super-chief.html

American documentary films
Documentary films about elections
Documentary films about Native Americans
Ojibwe culture
Films shot in Minnesota
Films set in Minnesota
1999 documentary films